Leonid Nikolaevich Maikov (Russian: Леонид Николаевич Майков; 1839–1900) was a prominent researcher in the history of Russian literature, a full member of the Saint Petersburg Academy of Sciences, president of the Russian Bibliological Society, Privy Councillor; the son of the painter Nikolay Maykov, the younger brother of Apollon, Valerian and Vladimir Maykov.

Biography
Maykov was born on April 9, 1839. He studied at the boarding school of Count Suzor and the 2nd Saint Petersburg Gymnasium and in 1860 graduated from the course of Saint Petersburg University as a candidate of the historical and philological faculty and for some time taught at the gymnasium of the Human–Loving Society. In the same year he was enlisted in the Foreign Trade Department of the Ministry of Finance.

In 1863 Maykov defended his thesis for a master's degree in Russian literature titled "On the Epics of the Vladimir Cycle", in which he proposed a historical point of view on the origin of epics: he indicated, in particular, that the epics of the Vladimirov cycle are a reflection of the Kiev specific period. Maykov did not last long in the Ministry of Finance and in 1864 he moved to the Central Statistical Committee and took an active part in its work until 1892, as well as in international statistical congresses. From 1868, Maykov worked as a professor at the Saint Petersburg Archaeological Institute.

In 1882 he was appointed assistant director of the Imperial Public Library. In 1889 he was elected an academician, in 1893 he was appointed vice president of the Academy of Sciences. By virtue of his rank of vice president, he was chairman of the Emperor Nicholas II Foundation to assist writers and scholars.

Maykov became a member of the Russian Geographical Society in 1864. Inn 1871 he headed the ethnographic department, in 1872–1886 he was the chairman of the ethnographic department and edited several of its publications, including five volumes of "Notes on the Ethnography Department". From 1868–1882 he was an assistant editor of the Journal of the Ministry of Education and from 1882–1890 editor.

Markov also began his literary activities as a student, posting a long series of historical and literary articles and reviews in "Domestic Notes", "Dawn", "Russian Herald", "Ancient and New Russia", "Russian Antiquity", "Russian Archive", "Journal of the Ministry of Public Education", "Historical Bulletin", "Russian Philological Bulletin" and others.

The most important of them are devoted to Simeon Polotsky, Lomonosov, Vasily Maykov, Sumarokov, Krylov, the history of Russian journalism, the ancient Russian story, the history of Russian superstitions and are collected under the title "Essays from the History of Russian Literature of the 17th and 18th Centuries" (Saint Petersburg, 1889, 1893).

Markov separately published "Materials and Research on Ancient Russian Literature" (1890–1891).

In 1889, Maykov edited a compilation of works by Konstantin Batyushkov with the assistance of Vladimir Saitov).

In 1891, he edited and characterized the collection of critical experiences of his brother Valerian.

In his master's thesis, Maykov showed significant scientific independence. In an era of almost undivided domination of the mythological explanation of folk poetry, he put forward a historical point of view on the origin of Russian epics, with is still respected by scholars. In Maykov's opinion, the Russian epic is a true echo of Russian historical life, and, in particular, the epics of the Vladimirov cycle, the Kiev specific period. Many heroes of epics – Dobrynya, Alyosha Popovich, Sadko, Ilya Muromets – the author, comparing the annals, considers them to be truly existing; in household details, he indicates traces of the actual historical life of 10th–13th centuries. Epics arose, in his opinion, among the squads.

Maykov died on April 20, 1900. He was buried in Saint Petersburg at the Novodevichy Cemetery.

Main works
Leonid Maykov. Great Russian Spells – Saint Petersburg: Maykov's Printing House, 1869, 164 Pages; 2nd Edition, Revised and Amended – Saint Petersburg: Publishing House of the European House, 1994
Leonid Maykov. Batyushkov, His Life and Works. Saint Petersburg: Balashev Printing House, 1887. [10], 360 Pages; 2nd Edition, Again Revised – Saint Petersburg, 1896
Leonid Maykov. Konstantin Batyushkov. Works: In 3 Volumes / With an Article on the Life and Works of Konstantin Batyushkov Written by Leonid Maykov and Notes Compiled by him and Vladimir Saitov – Saint Petersburg: Pompey Batyushkov, 1885–1887
Leonid Maykov. Essays from the History of Russian Literature of the 17th and 18th Centuries – Saint Petersburg: Alexey Suvorin, 1889, 7
Leonid Maykov. Pushkin: Biographical Materials and Historical and Literary Essays – Saint Petersburg: Longin Panteleev, 1899
Leonid Maykov. Pushkin. Works / Prepared and Provided with Notes by Leonid Maykov – Saint Petersburg: Printing House of the Imperial Academy of Sciences, 1899. Volume 1: Lyric Poems (1812–1817). 20, 296, 421 Pages; 2nd Edition – Saint Petersburg, 1900
Leonid Maykov. Materials for the Academic Publication of the Works of Alexander Pushkin / Collected by Leonid Maykov – Saint Petersburg: Printing House of the Imperial Academy of Sciences, 1902

Magazine articles
Leonid Maykov. Princess Maria Kantemirova (Part 1) // Russian Antiquity, 1897 – Volume 89 – No. 1 – Pages 49–69
Leonid Maykov. Princess Maria Kantemirova (Part 2) // Russian Antiquity, 1897. No. 3 – Pages 401–417
Leonid Maykov. Princess Maria Kantemirova (Part 3) // Russian Antiquity, 1897 – Volume 90 – No. 6 – Pages 425–451
Leonid Maykov. Princess Maria Kantemirova (Part 3) // Russian Antiquity, 1897 – Volume 91 – No. 8 – Pages 225–253
Leonid Maykov. Lev Yurlov and His Letter to Relatives (1743, September 11) // Russian Archive, 1868 – 2nd Edition – Moscow, 1869 – Columns 1058–1064
Leonid Maykov. Love Message of the 17th Century // Russian Archive, 1881 – Book 3 – Issue 6 – Pages 385–389
Leonid Maykov. A Note on the Shkurin Family // Russian Antiquity, 1896 – Volume 88 – No. 11 – Pages 421–422

References

Sources

Semyon Vengerov. Leonid Nikolaevich Maykov // Brockhaus and Efron Encyclopedic Dictionary: in 86 Volumes (82 Volumes and 4 Additional) – Saint Petersburg, 1890–1907

External links
Leonid Nikolaevich Maykov in the Library of Maxim Moshkov
Profile of Leonid Nikolaevich Maikov on the official website of the Russian Academy of Sciences
Historical background on the website of the Archive of the Russian Academy of Sciences

1839 births
1900 deaths
Recipients of the Order of St. Anna, 1st class
Recipients of the Order of St. Anna, 2nd class
Recipients of the Order of Saint Stanislaus (Russian), 1st class
Recipients of the Order of St. Vladimir, 3rd class
Recipients of the Order of St. Vladimir, 4th class
19th-century writers from the Russian Empire
Folklorists from the Russian Empire
Full members of the Saint Petersburg Academy of Sciences
Ethnographers from the Russian Empire
Burials at Novodevichy Cemetery (Saint Petersburg)
Privy Councillor (Russian Empire)
Journal of the Ministry of Education editors